Mahmoud El-Messouti (born 17 April 1960) is a Syrian wrestler. He competed in the men's freestyle 57 kg at the 1980 Summer Olympics.

References

1960 births
Living people
Syrian male sport wrestlers
Olympic wrestlers of Syria
Wrestlers at the 1980 Summer Olympics
Place of birth missing (living people)
Wrestlers at the 1982 Asian Games
Asian Games competitors for Syria
20th-century Syrian people